The Oxford Movement was a movement of high church members of the Church of England which began in the 1830s and eventually developed into Anglo-Catholicism. The movement, whose original devotees were mostly associated with the University of Oxford, argued for the reinstatement of some older Christian traditions of faith and their inclusion into Anglican liturgy and theology. They thought of Anglicanism as one of three branches of the "one, holy, catholic, and apostolic" Christian church. Many key participants subsequently converted to Roman Catholicism. 

The movement's philosophy was known as Tractarianism after its series of publications, the Tracts for the Times, published from 1833 to 1841. Tractarians were also disparagingly referred to as "Newmanites" (before 1845) and "Puseyites" (after 1845) after two prominent Tractarians, John Henry Newman and Edward Bouverie Pusey. Other well-known Tractarians included John Keble, Charles Marriott, Richard Froude, Robert Wilberforce, Isaac Williams and William Palmer. All except Williams and Palmer were fellows of Oriel College, Oxford.

Origins and early period

In the early nineteenth century, different groups vied for power and influence within the Church of England. Many, particularly in high office, saw themselves as latitudinarian (liberal). Conversely, many clergy in the parishes were Evangelicals, as a result of the revival led by John Wesley. Alongside this, the universities became the breeding ground for a movement to restore liturgical and devotional customs which borrowed heavily from traditions before the English Reformation as well as contemporary Roman Catholic traditions.

The immediate impetus for the Tractarian movement was a perceived attack by the reforming Whig administration on the structure and revenues of the Church of Ireland (the established church in Ireland), with the Irish Church Temporalities Bill (1833). This bill not only legislated administrative changes of the hierarchy of the church (for example, with a reduction of bishoprics and archbishoprics) but also made changes to the leasing of church lands, which some (including a number of Whigs) feared would result in a secular appropriation of ecclesiastical property. John Keble criticised these proposals as "National Apostasy" in his Assize Sermon in Oxford in 1833. The Tractarians criticised theological liberalism. The Gorham Case in which secular courts overruled an ecclesiastical court on the matter of a priest with heretical views, was also deeply unsettling. Their interest in Christian origins caused some of them to reconsider the relationship of the Church of England with the Roman Catholic Church.

The Tractarians postulated the Branch Theory, which states that Anglicanism along with Eastern Orthodoxy and Roman Catholicism form three "branches" of the historic pre-schism Catholic Church. Tractarians argued for the inclusion of traditional aspects of liturgy from medieval religious practice, as they believed the church had become too "plain". In the final tract, "Tract 90", Newman argued that the doctrines of the Roman Catholic Church, as defined by the Council of Trent, were compatible with the Thirty-Nine Articles of the 16th-century Church of England. Newman's eventual reception into the Roman Catholic Church in 1845, followed by Henry Edward Manning in 1851, had a profound effect upon the movement.

Publications
Apart from the Tracts for the Times, the group began a collection of translations of the Church Fathers, which they termed the Library of the Fathers. The collection eventually comprised 48 volumes, the last published three years after Pusey's death. They were issued through Rivington's company with the imprint of the Holyrood Press. The main editor for many of these was Charles Marriott. A number of volumes of original Greek and Latin texts were also published. One of the main contributions that resulted from Tractarianism is the hymnbook entitled Hymns Ancient and Modern which was published in 1861.

Influence and criticism

The Oxford Movement was criticised for being a mere "Romanising" tendency, but it began to influence the theory and practice of Anglicanism more broadly. The Oxford Movement was also criticised for being both secretive and collusive.

The Oxford Movement resulted in the establishment of Anglican religious orders, both of men and of women. It incorporated ideas and practices related to the practice of liturgy and ceremony to incorporate more powerful emotional symbolism in the church. In particular it brought the insights of the Liturgical Movement into the life of the church. Its effects were so widespread that the Eucharist gradually became more central to worship, vestments became common, and numerous Roman Catholic practices were re-introduced into worship. This led to controversies within churches that resulted in court cases, as in the dispute about ritualism.

Partly because bishops refused to give livings to Tractarian priests, many of them began working in slums. From their new ministries, they developed a critique of British social policy, both local and national. One of the results was the establishment of the Christian Social Union, of which a number of bishops were members, where issues such as the just wage, the system of property renting, infant mortality and industrial conditions were debated. The more radical Catholic Crusade was a much smaller organisation than the Oxford Movement. Anglo-Catholicism – as this complex of ideas, styles and organisations became known – had a significant influence on global Anglicanism.

The Oxford Movement in the United Kingdom brought its significant influence to the Republic of China (also known as 中華民國). Gu Hongming, one of the principal leaders of this movement, named it "the Oxford Movement In China" in his publication The Story Of the Oxford Movement In China, written in English. In that period, western civilizations and scientific technology were first introduced to China. They thusly created an intersectional cultural trend, making the Chinese government, especially the Chinese literati, feel a tremendous threat. As Gu Hongming stated in his work, the primary goal of this movement in China was to revive Confucius's orthodoxies that had long been rooted in the Chinese civilization in order to fight against liberalism, materialism, and utilitarianism in western cultures. Gu Hongming borrowed the term "Oxford Movement" by implying the fact that China was encountering the same situation and crisis as the United Kingdom --- bringing back the "official belief" to the country.

Gu Hongming's work, The Story Of the Oxford Movement In China, was initially published on February 1910. However, scholars only found the second edition in Shanghai, and the press added two new chapters according to the Chinese edition that Gu Hongming provided to the German priest.

End of Newman's involvement and receptions into Roman Catholicism

One of the principal writers and proponents of Tractarianism was John Henry Newman, a popular Oxford priest who, after writing his final tract, "Tract 90", became convinced that the Branch Theory was inadequate. Concerns that Tractarianism was a disguised Roman Catholic movement were not unfounded; Newman believed that the Roman and Anglican churches were wholly compatible. He was received into the Roman Catholic Church in 1845 and was ordained a priest of that church the same year. He later became a cardinal (but not a bishop). Writing on the end of Tractarianism as a movement, Newman stated:I saw indeed clearly that my place in the Movement was lost; public confidence was at an end; my occupation was gone. It was simply an impossibility that I could say any thing henceforth to good effect, when I had been posted up by the marshal on the buttery-hatch of every College of my University, after the manner of discommoned pastry-cooks, and when in every part of the country and every class of society, through every organ and opportunity of opinion, in newspapers, in periodicals, at meetings, in pulpits, at dinner-tables, in coffee-rooms, in railway carriages, I was denounced as a traitor who had laid his train and was detected in the very act of firing it against the time-honoured Establishment. Newman was one of a number of Anglican clergy who were received into the Roman Catholic Church during the 1840s who were either members of, or were influenced by, Tractarianism.

Other people influenced by Tractarianism who became Roman Catholics included:
Thomas William Allies, ecclesiastical historian and Anglican priest.
Edward Badeley, ecclesiastical lawyer.
Robert Hugh Benson, son of the Archbishop of Canterbury, novelist and monsignor.
John Chapman, patristic scholar and Roman Catholic priest.
Augusta Theodosia Drane, writer and Dominican prioress.
Cecil Chetwynd Kerr, Marchioness of Lothian, church founder and philanthropist.
Frederick William Faber, theologian, hymn writer, Oratorian and Roman Catholic priest.
Robert Stephen Hawker, poet and Anglican priest (became a Roman Catholic on his deathbed).
James Hope-Scott, barrister and Tractarian (received with Manning).
Gerard Manley Hopkins, poet and Jesuit priest.
Ronald Knox, Biblical text translator and Anglican priest.
Thomas Cooper Makinson, Anglican priest.
Henry Edward Manning, later Cardinal Archbishop of Westminster.
St. George Jackson Mivart, biologist (later interdicted by Cardinal Herbert Vaughan).
John Brande Morris, Orientalist, eccentric and Roman Catholic priest.
Augustus Pugin, architect.
Richard Sibthorp, Anglican and Roman Catholic priest (the first to convert, in 1841; later reconverted to Anglicanism)
William Gowan Todd, Roman Catholic priest
William George Ward, theologian.

Others associated with Tractarianism

Edward Burne-Jones
Richard William Church
William Coope
Margaret Anna Cusack
George Anthony Denison
Philip Egerton
Alexander Penrose Forbes
William Ewart Gladstone
George Cornelius Gorham
Renn Dickson Hampden
Walter Farquhar Hook
William Lockhart
John Medley
James Bowling Mozley
Thomas Mozley
John Mason Neale
William Upton Richards
Christina Rossetti
Lord Salisbury
James Henthorn Todd
Nathaniel Woodard
Charlotte Mary Yonge

See also

Anglican Breviary
Anglican Communion
Cambridge Camden Society
Confraternity of the Blessed Sacrament
Guild of All Souls
Library of Anglo-Catholic Theology
Neo-Lutheranism
Personal Ordinariate of Our Lady of Walsingham
Society of the Holy Cross
Society of King Charles the Martyr
Society of Mary (Anglican)
Crypto-papism

References

Further reading
 Bexell, Oloph, "The Oxford Movement as received in Sweden." Kyrkohistorisk årsskrift. Publications of the Swedish Society of Church History 1:106 (2006).
 Brown, Stewart J. & Nockles, Peter B. ed. The Oxford Movement: Europe and the Wider World 1830–1930, Cambridge: Cambridge University Press, 2012.
 Burgon, John, Lives of Twelve Good Men.  Includes biography of Charles Marriott.
 Chadwick, Owen. Mind of the Oxford Movement, Stanford: Stanford University Press, 1960.
 Church, R. W., The Oxford Movement: Twelve Years, 1835–1845, ed. and with an introd. by Geoffrey Best, in series, Classics of British Historical Literature, Chicago: University of Chicago Press, 1970. xxxii, [2], 280 p.  (pbk.)
 Church, R. W. The Oxford Movement: Twelve Years, 1833–1845, London: Macmillan & Co., 1891.
 Crumb, Lawrence N. The Oxford Movement and Its Leaders: a bibliography of secondary and lesser primary sources. (ATLA Bibliography Series, 56). Lanham, MD: Scarecrow Press, 2009.
 Dearing, Trevor Wesleyan and Tractarian Worship. London: Epworth Press, 1966.
 Dilworth-Harrison, T. Every Man's Story of the Oxford Movement. London: A. R. Mowbray & Co., 1932.
 Faught, C. Brad. The Oxford Movement: a thematic history of the Tractarians and their times, University Park, PA: Pennsylvania State University Press, 2003, 
 Halifax, Charles Lindley Wood, Viscount, The Agitation Against the Oxford Movement, Office of the English Church Union, 1899.
 Hall, Samuel. A Short History of the Oxford Movement, London: Longmans, Green and Co., 1906.
 Herring, George (2016) The Oxford Movement in Practice. Oxford University Press (based on the author's D.Phil. thesis; it examines the Tractarian parochial world from the 1830s to the 1870s)
 Hoppen, K. Theodore. "The Oxford Movement" History Today (Mar 1967) Vol. 17 Issue 3, p145-152 online
 Hutchison, William G. The Oxford Movement, being a Selection from Tracts for the Times, London: Walter Scott Pub. Co., 1906.
 Kelway, Clifton (1915) The Story of the Catholic Revival. London: Cope & Fenwick
 Kendall, James. "A New Oxford Movement in England," The American Catholic Quarterly Review, Vol. XXII, 1897.
 Leech, Kenneth & Williams, Rowan (eds) Essays Catholic and Radical: a jubilee group symposium for the 150th anniversary of the beginning of the Oxford Movement 1833–1983, London : Bowerdean, 1983ISBN 0-906097-10-X
 Liddon, Henry Parry, Life of E. B. Pusey, 4 vols. London, 1893.  The standard history of the Oxford Movement, which quotes extensively from their correspondence, and the source for much written subsequently.  The Library of the Fathers is discussed in vol. 1 pp. 420–440.  Available on archive.org.
 Norman, Edward R.  Church and Society in England 1770–1970: a historical study. Oxford:  Clarendon Press, 1976, .
 Nockles, Peter B. The Oxford Movement in Context: Anglican High Churchmanship 1760–1857. Cambridge: Cambridge University Press, 1996.
 Nockles, Peter B., "The Oxford Movement and its historiographers. Brilioth's 'Anglican Revival' and 'Three Lectures on Evangelicalism and The Oxford Movement' revisited." Kyrkohistorisk årsskrift. Publications of the Swedish Society of Church History 1:106 (2006).  
 Nye, George Henry Frederick. The Story of the Oxford Movement: A Book for the Times, Bemrose, 1899.
 Ollard, S. L. A Short History of the Oxford Movement, A. R. Mowbray & Co., 1915.
 Pereiro, J. 'Ethos' and the Oxford Movement: At the Heart of Tractarianism. Oxford: Oxford University Press, 2007.
 Pfaff, Richard W. "The Library of the Fathers: the Tractarians as Patristic translators," Studies in Philology; 70 (1973), p. 333ff.
 Skinner, S. A. Tractarians and the Condition of England: the social and political thought of the Oxford Movement. (Oxford Historical Monographs.) Oxford: Clarendon Press, 2004. 
 Wakeling, G. The Oxford Church Movement: Sketches and Recollections, Swan Sonnenschein & Co., 1895.
Walworth, Clarence A. The Oxford Movement in America. New York: United States Catholic Historical Society, 1974 (Reprint of the 1895 ed. published by the Catholic Book Exchange, New York).  
 Ward, Wilfrid. The Oxford Movement, T. C. & E. C. Jack, 1912.
 Webb, Clement Charles Julian. Religious Thought in the Oxford Movement, London: Macmillan, 1928.

External links 
 Tractarianism (Schaff-Herzog Encyclopedia of Religious Knowledge)
 The Oxford Movement. BBC Radio 4 discussion with Sheridan Gilley, Frances Knight & Simon Skinner (In Our Time, Apr 13, 2006)

History of Oxford
Anglo-Catholicism
Christianity in Oxford
History of the Church of England
19th-century Christianity
Subcultures of religious movements
Anglicanism